Michael Wayne Richardson (born December 8, 1946) is a former American football running back who played three seasons with the Houston Oilers of the National Football League. He was drafted by the Houston Oilers in the seventh round of the 1969 NFL Draft. Richardson played college football at Southern Methodist University and attended Castleberry High School in Fort Worth, Texas. He was also a member of the Winnipeg Blue Bombers and Houston Texans.

References

External links
Just Sports Stats

Living people
1946 births
Players of American football from Fort Worth, Texas
American football running backs
Canadian football running backs
American players of Canadian football
SMU Mustangs football players
Houston Oilers players
Winnipeg Blue Bombers players
Houston Texans (WFL) players
American Football League players